UCI Track Cycling Nations Cup is a season-long track cycling competition held over three rounds in different locations around the world. It was established in 2021 as the successor to the UCI Track Cycling World Cup.

Hosts

Overall winners

Nations

Men

Kilometer

Keirin

Individual sprint

Team sprint

Individual pursuit

Team pursuit

Madison

Omnium

Elimination race

Women

500 meters

Keirin

Individual sprint

Team sprint

Individual pursuit

Team pursuit

Madison

Omnium

Elimination race

References 

 
UCI World Cups
Track cycling races